This is a list of Christian punk bands, which include all notable Christian bands that fall under the category of punk or one of its subgenres, excluding hardcore genres. Christian hardcore bands are listed on the list of Christian hardcore bands.

Traditional punk rock 
Christian bands that were part of or draw from traditional punk rock.

 Ballydowse
 Blaster the Rocket Man
 Calibretto 13
 Children 18:3
 The Dingees
 Five Iron Frenzy
 Flatfoot 56
 Headnoise
 The Kings Kids
 Left Out
 Pocket Change
 Officer Negative
 One Bad Pig
 UnTeachers

Post-punk and new wave 
Artists associated with post-punk and new wave in Christian music.

 4-4-1
 The 77s
 Altar Boys
 Audio Adrenaline
 The Choir
 Crash Rickshaw
 Daniel Amos
 Danielson
 The Deadlines
 Edison Glass
 Jonezetta
 Joy Electric
 Mae
 Ninety Pound Wuss
 Neon Horse
 Queens Club 
 Quickflight
 Scaterd Few
 Starflyer 59
 Switchfoot
 Steve Taylor
 Steve Taylor & The Perfect Foil
 Undercover (early)
 Vector

Melodic punk and skate punk 
Melodic punk bands and artists in Christian music.

 180 Out
 Ace Troubleshooter
 The Almost
 Amber Pacific
 Anberlin
 ATTWN
 Bleach
 Blenderhead
 Capital Lights
 The Classic Crime
 Craig's Brother
 Dakoda Motor Co.
 David Crowder Band
 The Deadlines
 Dogwood (fourth album)
 Eisley
 Eleventyseven
 Emery
 Everyday Sunday
 False Idle
 Fighting Jacks
 FM Static
 The Fold
 Forever Changed
 Ghoti Hook
 Halo Friendlies
 Hangnail
 Hawk Nelson (early)
 House of Heroes
 The Huntingtons
 Hyland (band)
 I Am Empire
 Icon for Hire
 Inhabited
 Ivoryline
 Jesse & The Rockers
 Joy Electric
 The Juliana Theory
 Kids in the Way
 Kiros
 Last Tuesday 
 Mae
 Krystal Meyers (early)
 MxPx
 Much the Same
 Ninety Pound Wuss
 Number One Gun
 The O.C. Supertones
 PAX217
 Peter118
 Philmont
 Philmore
 Plankeye
 Poor Old Lu
 Queens Club
 Relient K
 Roper
 The Rocket Summer
 Run Kid Run
 Same as Sunday
 Sanctus Real
 Search the City
 Side Walk Slam
 Slick Shoes
 Stellar Kart
 Superchick
 Squad Five-O
 This Beautiful Republic
 The Undecided
 Undercover
 Value Pac
 The W's
 Watashi Wa
 The Wedding

See also
 List of Christian hardcore bands
 List of Christian rock bands

References 

Christian music lists
Lists of punk bands